Jason Baitieri (born 2 July 1989) is France international rugby league footballer who plays as a  for the FC Lézignan XIII in the Elite One Championship.

He has previously played for the Sydney Roosters in the NRL and on loan from Catalans at Saint-Esteve in the Elite One Championship.

Background
Baitieri was born in Paris, France to an Australian father Tas, a former professional rugby league footballer and coach, and a French mother.

He played his junior rugby league in Toulouse before returning to Castle Hill, New South Wales when he was 8, where he played for the Hills District Bulls.

Baiteri was educated at Oakhill College, Castle Hill and represented the 2007 Australian Schoolboys.

Playing career
Baitieri joined the Sydney Roosters via their feeder club, the Newtown Jets. He made his NRL debut against the Wests Tigers in May 2010. In August 2010, he joined the Catalans Dragons on a two-year contract.

In July 2015, Baitieri extended his contract with Catalans for a further two years.

He played in the 2018 Challenge Cup Final victory over the Warrington Wolves at Wembley Stadium.

International career
Baitieri made his international debut for France in the 2010 European Cup. He also played in a friendly international against England in 2011, 2012 Autumn International Series and he captained his country for the first time in their 2014 European Cup campaign.

After missing France's first match of the 2015 European Cup and test-match with England due to injury, Jason returned to captain France in their European Cup match against Wales.

He was selected in France 9s squad for the 2019 Rugby League World Cup 9s.

References

External links

Catalans Dragons profile
Sydney Roosters profile
France profile
2017 RLWC profile
SL profile

1989 births
Living people
AS Saint Estève players
Catalans Dragons players
France national rugby league team captains
France national rugby league team players
French people of Australian descent
French people of Italian descent
French rugby league players
Lézignan Sangliers players
People educated at Oakhill College
Rugby league locks
Sportspeople from Paris
Sydney Roosters players